Arikesari Maravarman (r. c. 640–690 CE), also known as Parankusa, was a Pandya king of early medieval south India. 

Arikesari's reign witnessed the beginning of the Pandya contest with the Pallavas in the northern Tamil country. He probably entered into an alliance with Chalukyas (to the counter the Pallavas). The Pandyas also came into collision with the Cheras ("Keralas") under his rule.

Period 
Arikesari Maravarman was the successor of Seliyan Sendan (Jayantavarman), but it is not known for certain if he was Jayantavarman's son or not (most probably his son).

 K. A. Nilakanta Sastri (the first assumption) - c. 670–710 CE
 K. A. Nilakanta Sastri (revised date) - c. 670–700 CE
 T. V. Sadasiva Pandarathar - c. 640–670 CE
Noburu Karashima - c. 650–700 CE (or) c. 670–700 CE
 V. Vedachalam & A. Kalavathi - c. 640–690 CE

He was succeeded by his son Kocchadaiyan Ranadhira.

Names 
In the Velvikkudi Grant and the Smaller Sinnamanur Plates, his name appears as "Arikesari Maravarman". In the Larger Sinnamanur Plates, he is called "Arikesari Parankusa".

Life and career

Velvikkudi Grant
The reign of Arikesari Maravarman probably saw a significant increase in the Pandya political power and prestige. 

According to the Velvikkudi Grant, Arikesari Maravarman won battles at Pali, Nelveli, and Uraiyur. In Nelveli, he is said to have conquered the vast forces of certain Vilveli. The victory at Nelveli is confirmed by the Larger Sinnamanur Plates. Except Uraiyur (Tiruchirappalli), the identity of these places is not certain. E. Hultzsch tentatively identified Nelveli with modern Tirunelveli, but K. A. N. Sastri disagreed with this identification.

Larger Sinnamanur Plates.
The Larger Sinnamanur Plates states that Arikesari "Parankusa" won battles at Nelveli and Sankaramangai. 

The inscription further states that he ruined the Paravars (people on the south-east coast of the Pandya country) who did not submit to him and destroyed the people of Kurunadu. According to one theory, "Kurunattar" refers to people of Kurunadu (an unidentified place); another possibility is that the term refers to petty chieftains.

Arikesari is also said to have defeated an unspecified enemy at Sennilam, which may refer to a particular place or is a generic term for "Red (Bloody) Battlefield". Finally, the inscription states that he defeated the Keralas (the Cheras) multiple times, and once imprisoned their king with his near relatives and warriors.

Role in the Chalukya-Pallava conflict 
Arikesari Maravarman seems to have joined with the Chalukyas in their struggle against the Pallavas. Early in the rule of Pallava king Parameswara I, Chalukya Vikramadtiya I advanced south and even displaced the Pallava from his capital Kanchi. The Chalukya then advanced further south to the Kaveri River and encamped at Uraiyur (where he probably effected a junction with Arikesari Maravarman).

Literary sources 
Commentary to the Iraiyanar Ahapporul mentions a king named Arikesari, with titles Parakusan and Nedumaran among others. The commentary also mention several battles, at Pali, Sennilam and Nelveli and at Vizhinjam, some of which the scholars do not read in epigraphy till late 8th century.

Based on this, historian Venkayya assumed that the two rulers are identical. However, K. A. N. Sastri rejected this identification on the basis that "a rhetorical work like this took for its hero a saintly king of legendary fame, and attributed to him all the achievements of the Pandyan lines of kings that the author could think of his day".

Religion 
Arikesari is known to have performed the Hiranyagarbha and Tulabhara rituals (a number of times).

Identification with Nedumaran 
Arikesari Maravarman is sometimes identified with Pandya king Nedumaran or Kuna Pandya, who converted from Jainism to Hinduism under the influence of the Bhakti saint Sambandar. Kun Pandya was thence regarded as a saint himself. The legend is considered as an expression of the historical consciousness (signifying the loss of Jain political influence in the Tamil country).

According to this legend, Kun Pandya had married the Chola princess Mangayarkkarasi.

References

Bibliography 
  
 
 
 
 
 
 

Pandyan kings
7th-century Indian monarchs
Year of birth unknown
Year of death unknown
8th-century Indian monarchs